Lennart Andersson (30 July 1925 – 27 November 2004) was a Swedish rower. He competed at the 1952 Summer Olympics and the 1956 Summer Olympics.

References

External links
 

1925 births
2004 deaths
Swedish male rowers
Olympic rowers of Sweden
Rowers at the 1952 Summer Olympics
Rowers at the 1956 Summer Olympics
People from Strömstad Municipality
Sportspeople from Västra Götaland County